Younker may refer to:

Surname
John L. Younker (1836–1911), American Civil War soldier
Marcus Younker (1839–1926), American businessman and retail executive

Other
Younkers, American department store
Younker Brothers Department Store, historic building in Des Moines, Iowa